How To Break Up A Happy Divorce is a 1976 American made-for-television comedy film starring Barbara Eden and Peter Bonerz, written and produced by writer partners, Gerald Gardner and Dee Caruso. It was broadcast on NBC on October 6, 1976.

Plot 

Ellen (Barbara Eden) and Carter (Peter Bonerz) used to be married, but are now divorced. Ellen is jealous of the woman Carter is dating, so her friend Eve (Marcia Rodd) advises her to try to make him jealous. She gets involved with Tony (Hal Linden), a handsome man-about-town.

Cast
 Barbara Eden as Ellen Dowling
 Hal Linden as Tony Bartlett
 Peter Bonerz as Carter Dowling
 Marcia Rodd as Eve
 Liberty Williams as Jennifer Hartman
 Harold Gould as Mr. Henshaw
 Chuck McCann as Man with hangover
 Archie Hahn as Harassed waiter

References

External links

1976 television films
1976 comedy films
1976 films
American comedy films
1970s English-language films
Films about divorce
Midlife crisis films
Midlife crisis in television
NBC network original films
Films with screenplays by Dee Caruso
Films with screenplays by Gerald Gardner (scriptwriter)
Films directed by Jerry Paris
1970s American films